Archiminolia iridescens is a species of sea snail, a marine gastropod mollusk in the family Solariellidae.

Distribution
This marine species occurs off Japan.

References

 Habe, T (1964), Shells of the Western Pacific in Colour, Vol.II, 233pp., 66pls., Hoikusha Publishing Company, 
 Hasegawa K. & Okutani T. (2011) A review of bathyal shell-bearing gastropods in Sagami Bay. Memoirs of the National Sciences Museum, Tokyo 47: 97-144.

External links
 To World Register of Marine Species

iridescens
Gastropods described in 1961